The  is a ship operating company in Osaka. The company belongs to Keihan Group. Founded in 1983, the company operates water buses on Ōkawa River and Dōtonbori Canal, an excursion cruise ship on the Port of Osaka, and a restaurant ship on Ōkawa River. The services include public lines listed below, as well as event cruises and chartered ships. The company once operated commuter ships as well, but the service was cancelled in 2005.

Lines
Arrows (→) indicate ships only go that direction. Dashes (—) indicate ships go both directions.
 (water bus)
Ōsakajō → Temmabashi → Yodoyabashi → OAP → Ōsakajō
Operated every day.
 (small water bus)
Ōsakajō — Dazaemonbashi — Minatomachi
Operated on weekends/holidays of spring and summer.
 (restaurant ship)
OAP → (Ōkawa River) → OAP
There are three courses: Lunch Cruise (takes 80 minutes), Afternoon Cruise (50 minutes), and Dinner Cruise (90 minutes). Closed on Mondays during the off seasons, and between early January and early February.
 (excursion cruise ship)
Kaiyūkan Aquarium West → (Port of Osaka) → Kaiyūkan Aquarium West
There are Day Cruise (takes 50 minutes) and Night Cruise (105 minutes). Operated every day.

Ships

Aqualiners (Water bus)

Aqua Mini boats (Small water bus)

 (Restaurant ship)
A restaurant ship, meaning a cruise ship mainly made for its restaurant cruise service. 
 (Excursion cruise ship / restaurant ship)
A ship modeled after Santa María, a sailing ship of Christopher Columbus, albeit 2 times larger.

Stations

See also
Water taxi

External links
 Official website

Ferry companies of Japan
Shipping companies of Japan
Transport in Osaka Prefecture
Water taxis